Jarvis may refer to:

People
 Jarvis (name), both as a surname and given name
 Järvis, an Estonian surname

Places 
 3353 Jarvis, an asteroid named after Gregory Jarvis
 Jarvis, Missouri, a community in the United States
 Jarvis, Ontario, Canada, a small town near Lake Erie in Haldimand County
 Jarvis Creek, a river in Rice County, Kansas, United States
 Jarvis Island, a territory of the United States located in the South Pacific

Facilities and structures
 Jarvis Collegiate Institute, a high school located in Toronto, Ontario, Canada
 The Jarvis, an apartment building on the National Register of Historic Places in Cambridge, Massachusetts, United States
 Jarvis (CTA), a rapid transit station in Chicago, Illinois

Brands and enterprises
 Jarvis of Wimbledon (Jarvis & Sons Ltd), London bicycle manufacturers and coachbuilders in the early- to mid-20th century
 Jarvis plc, United Kingdom public sector contractor

Fictional characters
 Jarvis, a character in the Tron franchise
 Cookie Jarvis, former cartoon mascot of Cookie Crisp cereal
 Edwin Jarvis, fictional Marvel Comics butler
 J.A.R.V.I.S., the AI personality inspired by that character
 Tommy Jarvis, a character from the Friday the 13th franchise
 Jarvis Lorry, a character in the novel A Tale of Two Cities
 Jarvis Montgomery a character portrayed by Rob Newman in the comedy series Newman and Baddiel in Pieces

Vehicles
 , a series of three ships with the name
 Jarvis (rocket), a launch vehicle named after Gregory Jarvis
 Project Jarvis, a Blue Origin project to develop a fully-reusable second stage rocket
 , a Hamilton-class cutter

Other uses 
 Jarvis (album), debut solo album by Jarvis Cocker
Jarvis algorithm, also known as the gift wrapping algorithm

See also

 
 
 Jervis (disambiguation)
 Javits (disambiguation)